Vriesea gracilior is a plant species in the genus Vriesea. This species is endemic to Brazil.

References

gracilior
Flora of Brazil